Michael Dalgan Lyons (1 November 1910 – 19 November 1991) was an Irish Fine Gael politician from Ballyhaunis, County Mayo.

A farmer and former employee of the Irish Sugar Company, he stood unsuccessfully as a Fine Gael candidate for Dáil Éireann in the Mayo South constituency at three successive general elections (1954, 1957, and 1961) before finally winning the seat at the 1965 general election to the 18th Dáil. He served only one term in the Dáil, losing his seat at the 1969 general election.

Lyons did not stand for the Dáil again, but after his 1969 defeat he was elected to the 12th Seanad on the Oireachtas sub-panel of the Labour Panel. He was re-elected in 1973 to the 13th Seanad and in 1977 to the 14th Seanad, but did not contest the 1981 Seanad election.

References

1910 births
1991 deaths
Fine Gael TDs
Members of the 18th Dáil
Members of the 12th Seanad
Members of the 13th Seanad
Members of the 14th Seanad
Politicians from County Mayo
Irish farmers
Fine Gael senators